The 1950 Auburn Tigers football team represented Auburn University in the 1950 college football season. It was the Tigers' 59th overall and 18th season as a member of the Southeastern Conference (SEC). The team was led by head coach Earl Brown, in his third year, and played their home games at Cliff Hare Stadium in Auburn and the Cramton Bowl in Montgomery, Alabama. They finished winless with a record of zero wins and ten losses (0–10 overall, 0–7 in the SEC). In the February that followed the completion of the season, Brown was fired as head coach of the Tigers.

Schedule

References

Auburn
Auburn Tigers football seasons
College football winless seasons
Auburn Tigers football